The Avranlo fortress is a megalithic structure in the Tsalka Municipality in Georgia's south-central region of Kvemo Kartli. A cyclopean fortification built using a dry masonry technique, it is located 0.5 km northwest of the eponymous village, on the left bank of the Ktsia river, at 1640 m above sea level. It dates to the last quarter of the 1st millennium BC.    

Avranlo is a megalithic complex arranged in three tiers of terraces overlooking the river canyon. The lowest tier, at the base of the mount, consists of an approximately 80-meter-long semicircular wall, which stands 3 meters high in places. There is a single gate, 1.9 m high and 1.75 m wide, which is roofed with a monolith 2.2 m long and 1.8 m wide. Large stones are scattered elsewhere. Between this wall and the mount there is a small medieval Christian church and several caves nearby, collectively referred to as the Abibos monastery. 

The second and third tiers are genuine "cyclopean" structures, characterized by large rocks, dry-stone masonry, and an unusual mode of arrangement. The third, uppermost tier tops the mount. It has a rectangular ground plan, 25 m in length and 18 m in width. The walls are 3-4 m thick. The structure is significantly damaged and many parts of it have been obliterated. Archaeological digs at the adjacent fields, north of the megalithic fortress, yielded, in 2006, a Kura–Araxes culture-type settlement and a necropolis dating from the 12th-11th century BC.  

The fortress was inscribed on the list of the Immovable Cultural Monuments of National Significance of Georgia in 2007. In September 2019, a multiyear archaeological research project was launched by Georgia's culture heritage authorities for further study and conservation of the country's megalithic complexes, including those at Abuli, Shaori, Avranlo, and Sameba.

References 

Buildings and structures in Kvemo Kartli
Immovable Cultural Monuments of National Significance of Georgia
Castles and forts in Georgia (country)
Prehistoric Georgia (country)